Astro Battle 2009 (or sometimes just Astro Battle, since 2009 is actually the model number) is a Space Invaders clone published by Bally Manufacturing in 1979 for the Bally Astrocade arcade system.

Gameplay
The aim is to defeat waves of aliens with a laser cannon and earn as many points as possible. Unlike Space Invaders, Astro Battle 2009 is in color.

References

1978 video games
Bally Astrocade games
Fixed shooters
Video game clones
Video games developed in the United States